"Thunderstruck" is the lead single from the 1990 album The Razors Edge by Australian hard rock band AC/DC. It peaked at  5 on the US Billboard Hot Mainstream Rock Tracks. In 2010, "Thunderstruck" topped Triple M Melbourne's Ultimate 500 Rock Countdown in Australia. The top five were all AC/DC songs.

Background
Angus Young stated in the liner notes of the 2003 re-release of The Razors Edge:

The song has sold over a million digital copies since it became available for digital download.

In January 2018, as part of Triple M's "Ozzest 100", the 'most Australian' songs of all time, "Thunderstruck" was ranked No. 8.

The song is one of the most recognisable in the bands' entire catalog and it is a setlist staple having been performed at nearly all shows since its release. With the exception of new material from albums they are touring behind, it is one of only three songs released after Back in Black that are still performed live by the band, the others being 1981's "For Those About to Rock (We Salute You)" and 2008's "Rock and Roll Train".

Music video
The video directed by David Mallet, which accompanied the single was filmed at London's Brixton Academy on  1990. The audience members were given free T-shirts with the words "AC/DC – I was Thunderstruck" on the front and the date on the back, and these T-shirts were worn by the entire audience throughout the filming of the video.

On 29 October 2021, the video hit one billion views on YouTube, the first AC/DC music video to do so.

Critical reception
"Thunderstruck" is widely considered one of the band's best songs. The Guardian ranked the song number eight on its list of the 40 greatest AC/DC songs, and the British rock magazine Kerrang! ranked the song number six on its list of the 20 greatest AC/DC songs.

Use in media

The song has been featured in the following movies: 
Varsity Blues
The Longest Yard 
Iron Man 2 (trailers only, not the actual film)
Battleship 
Delivery Man
Planes: Fire & Rescue
Daddy's Home and Daddy's Home 2 
Deadpool 2 

It has also been played in episodes of My Name Is Earl, Hawaii Five-0, Top Gear, New Girl, Training Day, Supernatural, Titans, SAS: Rogue Heroes and Star Trek: Prodigy. The song is also used at many sporting events including every Marshall Thundering Herd football game, and the Dallas Cowboys Cheerleaders dance to this song at the preshow before the Dallas Cowboys games.

In 2021, the song was played during the pre-race show when Texas Motor Speedway hosted the NASCAR All-Star Race for the first time.

Sampled in Name Drop by Excision and Wooli.

Charts

Weekly charts

Year-end charts

Certifications

!scope="col" colspan="3"| Ringtones
|-

Personnel
Brian Johnson – lead vocals
Angus Young – lead guitar
Malcolm Young – rhythm guitar, backing vocals
Cliff Williams – bass guitar, backing vocals
Chris Slade – drums, percussion

Cyber attack of the Iranian nuclear program 
The song was used as part of the payload of a computer virus which attacked the Iranian nuclear program between 2009 and 2010. Reportedly developed by the US and Israeli governments, Stuxnet took control of centrifuge controls in nuclear facilities across the country causing extensive damage to machinery. Additionally, various workstations were hijacked with the song playing randomly at high volume late at night. In an email sent to Finnish computer security expert, Mikko Hypponen of F-Secure, one of the scientists involved in the program was quoted as saying:

See also 
 List of best-selling singles in Australia

References

External links 
 [ "Thunderstruck" at AllMusic.com]
 Songfacts for Thunderstuck
 The Ultimate AC/DC Discography

AC/DC songs
Ministry (band) songs
1990 singles
Songs written by Angus Young
Songs written by Malcolm Young
Song recordings produced by Bruce Fairbairn
1990 songs
Atco Records singles
Number-one singles in Finland
Heavy metal songs